The Cook Islands competed at the 2013 World Championships in Athletics in Moscow, Russia, from 10 to 18 August 2013. A team of one athlete was announced to represent the country in the event.

References

External links
IAAF World Championships – Cook Islands

Nations at the 2013 World Championships in Athletics
World Championships in Athletics
Cook Islands at the World Championships in Athletics